Balloon phobia or globophobia is a fear of balloons. The source of fear may be the sound of balloons popping.

Generally, people with globophobia will refuse to touch, feel, or go near a balloon for fear it will burst.

This is a form of phonophobia.

References

Phobias
Balloons (entertainment)